Perissityidae is an extinct taxonomic family of fossil sea snails, i.e., marine gastropod mollusks.

References

Prehistoric gastropods